The Gila topminnow or charalito (Poeciliopsis occidentalis) is a species of fish in the family Poeciliidae. It is found in Mexico and the United States.

Description

The Gila topminnow has an elongated curved body. The belly is often white with darker body above, has scales with dark outlines, and a lateral dark band on the side.

Distribution

Gila topminnow once occupied in the Gila River drainage in Arizona, New Mexico, and Mexico. Currently, they are known to be in Gila River drainage in Arizona and Mexico.

Biology

Gila topminnow was once the most common fish found in the Gila River drainage. They are fertilized internally; reproduction season usually is from April to November. The female gives birth from 10–15 young per brood. These young brood will reach maturity from a weeks to several months. Gila topminnow are omnivorous, and eat food such as detritus and amphipod crustaceans; but feed mostly on aquatic insect larvae, especially mosquitos.

Habitat

This species of fish prefers to live in shallow warm water in headwater springs. They can survive in water with temperature ranging from near freezing to near . They can also live in water with a wide range of pH from 6.6 – 8.9 and salinity from fresh water to sea water.

Conservation

Gila topminnow are endangered due to predation and competition from the introduced mosquitofish. Threats also come from continued habitat loss due to water development, habitat degradation due to erosion from roads and drought. Gila topminnow from Sharp Spring are currently being held and bred at Dexter National Fish Hatchery & Technology Center at Dexter, New Mexico, for re-introduction to wild habitats.

References

External links
IUCN Red List treatment: Poeciliopsis occidentalis – Charalito.   
IUCN: all species searchpage

Poeciliopsis
Fish of the Western United States
Fauna of the Sonoran Desert
Gila River
Freshwater fish of the United States
Near threatened fauna of North America
Near threatened biota of Mexico
Taxonomy articles created by Polbot
ESA endangered species
Taxa named by Spencer Fullerton Baird
Taxa named by Charles Frédéric Girard
Fish described in 1853